Manor Park may refer to:

Canada
Manor Park, Nova Scotia, a neighbourhood in Dartmouth
Manor Park, Ottawa, a neighbourhood in Ottawa

New Zealand
Manor Park, New Zealand, a suburb of Lower Hutt

United Kingdom
Manor Park, London
Manor Park, Sutton
Manor Park, a park in Hither Green, London
Manor Park, an area in Manor, South Yorkshire, part of Sheffield
Manor Park, Nuneaton, a football stadium in Warwickshire
Manor Park Country Park, in Kent

United States
Manor Park, Larchmont, in New York
Manor Park, Washington, D.C., a neighborhood